AddToAny is a universal sharing platform that can be integrated into a website by use of a web widget or plugin. Once installed, visitors to the website can share or save an item using a variety of services. AddToAny makes money by selling anonymous aggregate sharing data to advertisers.

History
 March 2006, launched.
 July 2011, acquired by social commerce site Lockerz.
 June 2013, reacquired by Pat Diven II, original founder.

References

External links
 

Social bookmarking websites
Sharing
Drupal
WordPress